The Jamaica Channel is a strait separating the islands of Jamaica and Hispaniola, in the Caribbean Sea. Along with the Windward Passage to its north.

Navassa Island

References

External links
Aerial view.

Straits of Jamaica
Straits of the Caribbean
Bodies of water of Haiti
Haiti–Jamaica border
International straits
Borders of Navassa Island
Geography of Hispaniola